Kevin C. Fitzpatrick (born January 10, 1966), is an American historian and non-fiction writer. He is best known for his research and writings on Dorothy Parker and the Algonquin Round Table.

Early life 
Fitzpatrick was born in Baltimore, Maryland in 1966, but spent his childhood in Bethlehem, Pennsylvania; Summit, New Jersey; Raleigh, North Carolina; and St. Louis, Missouri. 
He is a graduate of Truman State University (formerly Northeast Missouri State University). While a student at NMSU Fitzpatrick co-founded The Pundit, an independent newspaper that served primarily the student population and young adults of the Kirksville, Missouri area. He served six years in the U.S. Marine Corps Reserves as a journalist-photographer.

Career 
Fitzpatrick has had a varied multimedia career including newspapers, television, advertising agencies, magazines, and more recently web-based publishing and editing. In the latter he has produced close to 75 websites and written for numerous trade publications. When not involved with media pursuits, Fitzpatrick is a certified New York City sightseeing guide, giving walking tours of historic locations, landmarks, cemeteries and drinking establishments. He is also a frequent guest speaker at libraries and literary clubs.  Fitzpatrick cites among his biggest influences Dorothy Parker, Robert Benchley, Franklin P. Adams, and Stanley Walker. Fitzpatrick produces the award-winning dorothyparker.com, which he launched in 1998. He is the president of the Dorothy Parker Society, which he founded in 1999. He was also instrumental in the effort to get Dorothy Parker's birthplace in Long Branch, New Jersey, named a National Literary Landmark by Friends of Libraries USA. Fitzpatrick oversaw the creation of a bronze memorial plaque that was unveiled in August 2005 in Parker's hometown. In 2020 Fitzpatrick brought Parker's ashes from Baltimore to New York City and interred them Woodlawn Cemetery. On August 23, 2021, he unveiled a new gravestone for Parker's family. 

In conjunction with the Algonquin Hotel, Fitzpatrick leads walking tours of the former Algonquin Round Table homes and haunts in Manhattan. In 2009 Fitzpatrick founded Donald Books, a small independent publishing company.

The Lambs 
Fitzpatrick was elected to The Lambs Theatre Club in May 2015, and became shepherd in 2023.

Personal life 
Fitzpatrick and his family reside in Manhattan and the Town of Shelter Island.

Awards

Selected works 
111 Places in the Bronx That You Must Not Miss from Emons-Verlag
World War I New York: A Guide to the City's Enduring Ties to the Great War from Globe Pequot Press
The Algonquin Round Table New York: A Historical Guide from Lyons Press
The Governors Island Explorer's Guide from Globe Pequot Press
Under the Table: A Dorothy Parker Cocktail Guide from Lyons Press
A Journey into Dorothy Parker’s New York from Roaring Forties Press
Dorothy Parker Complete Broadway, 1918-1923 from Donald Books
The Lost Algonquin Round Table: Humor, Fiction, Journalism, Criticism and Poetry From America’s Most Famous Literary Circle from Donald Books

References

External links

The Dorothy Parker Society
Roaring Forties Press

1966 births
Living people
American information and reference writers
Writers from St. Louis
Writers from Summit, New Jersey
Writers from Manhattan
Truman State University alumni
United States Marines
People from the Upper West Side
20th-century American historians
American male non-fiction writers
Algonquin Round Table
Historians from New York (state)
20th-century American male writers
Historians from New Jersey
Members of The Lambs Club
The Lambs presidents